The Hasty Pudding Man of the Year award is bestowed annually by the Hasty Pudding Theatricals society at Harvard University.  It has been awarded since 1967 to performers deemed by the society members to have made a "lasting and impressive contribution to the world of entertainment."

The Man of the Year recipient is traditionally invited to Harvard Square for various events in his honor before the opening night of the Hasty Pudding show.  These include a tour of historic Harvard Yard with entertainment by the Radcliffe Pitches and culminate with a dinner and roast by the Hasty Pudding Theatricals members.

Below is a list of the men who have received the award:

Man of the Year recipients
 2023 – Bob Odenkirk
 2022 – Jason Bateman
 2020 – Ben Platt
 2019 – Milo Ventimiglia
 2018 – Paul Rudd
 2017 – Ryan Reynolds
 2016 – Joseph Gordon-Levitt
 2015 – Chris Pratt
 2014 – Neil Patrick Harris 
 2013 – Kiefer Sutherland
 2012 – Jason Segel
 2011 – Jay Leno
 2010 – Justin Timberlake
 2009 – James Franco
 2008 – Christopher Walken
 2007 – Ben Stiller
 2006 – Richard Gere
 2005 – Tim Robbins
 2004 – Robert Downey Jr.
 2003 – Martin Scorsese
 2002 – Bruce Willis
 2001 – Anthony Hopkins
 2000 – Billy Crystal
 1999 – Samuel L. Jackson
 1998 – Kevin Kline
 1997 – Mel Gibson
 1996 – Harrison Ford
 1995 – Tom Hanks
 1994 – Tom Cruise
 1993 – Chevy Chase
 1992 – Michael Douglas
 1991 – Clint Eastwood
 1990 – Kevin Costner
 1989 – Robin Williams
 1988 – Steve Martin
 1987 – Mikhail Baryshnikov
 1986 – Sylvester Stallone
 1985 – Bill Murray
 1984 – Sean Connery
 1983 – Steven Spielberg
 1982 – James Cagney
 1981 – John Travolta
 1980 – Alan Alda
 1979 – Robert De Niro
 1978 – Richard Dreyfuss
 1977 – Johnny Carson
 1976 – Robert Blake
 1975 – Warren Beatty
 1974 – Peter Falk
 1973 – Jack Lemmon
 1972 – Dustin Hoffman
 1971 – James Stewart
 1970 – Robert Redford
 1969 – Bill Cosby
 1968 – Paul Newman
 1967 – Bob Hope

See also
 Hasty Pudding Woman of the Year

References

External links
 Hasty Pudding Man and Woman of the Year

Harvard University
Lists of men
1967 establishments in the United States
Awards established in 1967